John Humphreys Davies (15 April 1871 – 10 August 1926) was a Welsh lawyer, bibliographer and educator. He joined the movement to start a National Library of Wales.

Family and schooling
Born at Llangeitho, Ceredigion, he was the son of Robert J. Davies, Cwrtmawr. He was educated at the University College of Wales, Aberystwyth and Lincoln College, Oxford, before being called to the bar at Lincoln's Inn.

Welsh literature
Davies's interest in Welsh literature is associated with O. M. Edwards at Oxford and to his brother-in-law, T. E. Ellis.

Along with Sir John Williams, who became his President while Principal at Aberystwyth, Davies was involved in the movement to establish a National Library for Wales. He was President of Aberystwyth Old Students' Association in 1907–1908.

Public life
From an early age Davies became involved in public life, being elected an alderman of Cardiganshire County Council in 1895 at the age of 24, while not yet an elected councillor. He gained some support in that year as the new Liberal candidate for Cardiganshire in succession to Bowen Rowlands. The nomination, however, went to Matthew Vaughan-Davies.

Davies served as Chairman of Cardiganshire County Council in 1916–1917.

In 1905 he became Registrar of his alma mater and principal in 1919, a position which he held until his death at the age of 55.

References

Bibliography

1871 births
1926 deaths
Welsh scholars and academics
Welsh barristers
Welsh educators
Alumni of Aberystwyth University
Aberystwyth Old Students' Association
Alumni of Lincoln College, Oxford
Members of Lincoln's Inn
Vice-Chancellors of Aberystwyth University
Members of Cardiganshire County Council